I Can Read! is a line of beginning reading books published by HarperCollins. The series is rated by level and is widely used to teach children to read English. The first book in the series was Else Holmelund Minarik's Little Bear, published in 1957, and subsequent notable titles have included Amelia Bedelia and Frog and Toad.

Structure
The I Can Read! series divides its output into 6 levels

My Very First - For teaching children vowels
My First - For reading aloud to children.
Level  1 - For children who have begun to read sounds and sentences aloud.
Level  2 - For children who can read confidently, but still benefit from help.
Level  3 - Enjoyable titles for children to read unassisted.
Level  4 - Advanced titles to further develop the readers' literacy.

History
The I Can Read! series began with 1957's Little Bear,  by Else Holmelund Minarik and illustrated by Maurice Sendak.

In late 2020, HarperCollins announced the addition of a new series called "I Can Read! Comics". It is set to be released in June 2021 with four books, from levels 1 to 3.

There are now over 500 titles in the series.

Other languages and formats
Some I Can Read! books are also available in Spanish, French, audiobook, and e-book format.

Recognition
I Can Read! books have won Newbery Medal and Caldecott Medal honors.

Selected titles
 Amelia Bedelia series, Peggy and Herman Parish
 At Home in a New Land, Joan Sandin 
 Biscuit series, Alyssa Satin Capucilli
 Danny and the Dinosaur, story and pictures by Syd Hoff (1958)
 Frog and Toad series, Arnold Lobel
 Little Bear series, by Else Holmelund Minarik, pictures by Maurice Sendak
 Two Silly Trolls, Nancy Jewell
 The Witch Who Was Afraid of Witches, Alice Low
 Indian Summer, by F.N. Monjo, pictures by Anita Lobel
 Little Bear by Else Holmelund Minarik, pictures by Maurice Sendak (1957)
 Father Bear Comes Home by Else Holmelund Minarik, pictures by Maurice Sendak (1958)
 Little Bear's Friend by Else Holmelund Minarik, pictures by Maurice Sendak (1960)
 Little Bear's Visit by Else Holmelund Minarik, pictures by Maurice Sendak (1961)
 No Fighting, No Biting! by Else Holmelund Minarik, pictures by Maurice Sendak (1958)
 Julius, story and pictures by Syd Hoff (1959)
 Oliver, story and pictures by Syd Hoff (1959)
 Chester, story and pictures by Syd Hoff (1959)
 Stanley, story and pictures by Syd Hoff (1959)
 Little Chief, story and pictures by Syd Hoff (1959)
 Last One Home Is a Green Pig by Edith Thacher Hurd, pictures by Clement Hurd (1959)
 Hurry Hurry by Edith Thacher Hurd, pictures by Clement Hurd (1959)
 Stop Stop by Edith Thacher Hurd, pictures by Clement Hurd (1959)
 No Funny Business by Edith Thacher Hurd, pictures by Clement Hurd (1959)
 Emmett's Pig by Mary Stolz, pictures by Garth Williams
 Harry and the Lady Next Door by Gene Zion, pictures by Margaret Bloy Graham
 The Fire Cat, story and pictures by Esther Averill
 The Rooftop Mystery by Joan M. Lexau, pictures by Syd Hoff
 David and the Giant, by Mike McClintock, pictures of Fritz Siebel
 Morris Is a Cowboy, a Policeman and a Baby Sitter, story and pictures by B. Wiseman
 A Picture for Harold's Room, story and pictures by Crockett Johnson
 Tell Me Some More by Crosby Bonsall, pictures by Fritz Siebel
 Who's a Pest? by Crosby Bonsall
 The Happy Birthday Present by Joan Heilbroner, pictures by Mary Chalmers
 This Is the House Where Jack Lives by Joan Heilbroner, pictures by Aliki
 Little Runner of the Longhouse by Betty Baker, pictures by Arnold Lobel
 What Do They Do? Policemen and Firemen by Carla Greene, pictures by Leonard Kessler
 What Spot?, story and pictures by Crosby Bonsall
 The Secret Three by Mildred Myrick, pictures of Arnold Lobel
 Doctors and Nurses: What Do They Do? by Carla Greene, pictures by Leonard Kessler
 Grizzwold, by Syd Hoff
 Emily's First 100 Days Of School by Rosemary Wells
 Soldiers and Sailors: What Do They Do? by Carla Greene, pictures by Leonard Kessler
 Lucille, story and pictures by Arnold Lobel
 Red Fox and His Canoe by Nathaniel Benchley
 Railroad Engineers and Airplane Pilots: What Do They Do?
 Tom and the Two Handles by Russell Hoban, pictures by Lillian Hoban
 Three to Get Ready by Betty Boegehold, pictures by Mary Chalmers
 Johnny Lion's Book, by Edith Thacher Hurd, pictures by Clement Hurd
 Oscar Otter, by Nathaniel Benchley, pictures by Arnold Lobel
 Juan Bobo series, by Virginia Schomp, pictures by Jess Yeomans

Mystery Books
 The Case of the Hungry Stranger, story and pictures by Crosby Bonsall
 The Case of the Cat's Meow, story and pictures by Crosby Bonsall
 Big Max, by Kin Platt, pictures by Robert Lopshire

Sports Books
 Here Comes the Strikeout, story and pictures by Leonard Kessler
 Kick, Pass, and Run, story and pictures by Leonard Kessler

Early Books
 Cat and Dog by Else Holmelund Minarik, pictures by Fritz Siebel
 Who Will Be My Friends?, story and pictures by Syd Hoff
 Albert the Albatross, story and pictures by Syd Hoff
 What Have I Got?, by Mike McClintock, pictures by Leonard Kessler
 Come and Have Fun, by Edith Thacher Hurd, pictures by Clement Hurd
 Mine's the Best, by Crosby Bonsall
 Hester the Jester, by Ben Schecter
 The Case of the Dumb Bells, story and pictures by Crosby Bonsall
 The Homework Caper, by Joan M. Lexau, pictures by Syd Hoff

Science I CAN READ Books
 Seeds and More Seeds by Millicent E. Selsam, pictures by Tomi Ungerer
 Plenty of Fish by Millicent Selsam, pictures by Erik Blegvad
 Tony's Birds by Millicent Selsam, pictures by Kurt Werth
 Terry and the Caterpillars by Millicent Selsam, pictures by Arnold Lobel
 Red Tag Comes Back by Fred Phleger, pictures by Arnold Lobel
 Prove It! by Rose Wyler and Gerald Ames, pictures by Talivaldis Stubis
 Greg's Microscope by Millicent Selsam, pictures by Arnold Lobel
 Seahorse by Robert A. Morris, pictures by Arnold Lobel
 Let's Get Turtles by Millicent Selsam, pictures by Arnold Lobel
 Benny's Animals and How He Put Them In Order, by Millicent Selsam, pictures by John Kaufmann
 When an Animal Grows, by Millicent Selsam
 Hidden Animals, by Millicent Selsam
 The Toad Hunt, by Janet Chenery
 Ants Are Fun, by Mildred Myrick, pictures by Arnold Lobel
 Wolfie, by Janet Chenery
 Catch a Whale by the Tail, by Edward Ricciuti
 The Penguins Are Coming, by R.L. Penney
 A Nest of Wood Ducks, by Evelyn Shaw, pictures by Cherryl Pape
 The Bug That Laid the Golden Eggs, Millicent Selsam
 Alligator by Evelyn S. Shaw
 Octopus by Evelyn S. Shaw
 Woodchuck by Faith McNulty
 Elephant Seal Island by Evelyn S. Shaw
 More Potatoes! by Millicent Selsam
 Fireflies by Joanne Ryder
 Barn Owl by Phyllis Flower
 Egg to Chick by Millicent Selsam
 An Animal for Alan by Edward R. Ricciuti, pictures by Tom Eaton
 Donald and the Fish That Walked by Edward R. Ricciuti
 Fish Out of School by Evelyn S. Shaw
 Look for a Bird by Edith Thacher Hurd

References

 "Biscuit Goes to School" by Alyssa Satin Capucilli; pictures by Pat Schories. Fiction, 26 pages. HarperCollins Publishers, 2002. .

External links

Book series introduced in 1957
American children's books
Learning to read
Series of children's books
William Collins, Sons books
HarperCollins books